Madubashanipuram is a village in the Pattukkottai taluk of Thanjavur district, Tamil Nadu, India.

Demographics 

As per the 2001 census, Madubashanipuram had a total population of 1036 with 511 males and 525 females. The sex ratio was 1027. The literacy rate was 60.66.

References 

 

Villages in Thanjavur district